Grok  is a neologism coined by American writer Robert A. Heinlein for his 1961 science fiction novel Stranger in a Strange Land. While the Oxford English Dictionary summarizes the meaning of grok as "to understand intuitively or by empathy, to establish rapport with" and "to empathize or communicate sympathetically (with); also, to experience enjoyment", Heinlein's concept is far more nuanced, with critic Istvan Csicsery-Ronay Jr. observing that "the book's major theme can be seen as an extended definition of the term." The concept of grok garnered significant critical scrutiny in the years after the book's initial publication. The term and aspects of the underlying concept have become part of communities such as computer science.

Descriptions of grok in Stranger in a Strange Land
Critic David E. Wright Sr. points out that in the 1991 "uncut" edition of Stranger, the word grok "was used first without any explicit definition on page 22" and continued to be used without being explicitly defined until page 253 (emphasis in original). He notes that this first intensional definition is simply "to drink", but that this is only a metaphor "much as English 'I see' often means the same as 'I understand'". Critics have bridged this absence of explicit definition by citing passages from Stranger that illustrate the term. A selection of these passages follows:

Etymology

Robert A. Heinlein originally coined the term grok in his 1961 novel Stranger in a Strange Land as a Martian word that could not be defined in Earthling terms, but can be associated with various literal meanings such as "water", "to drink", "life", or "to live", and had a much more profound figurative meaning that is hard for terrestrial culture to understand because of its assumption of a singular reality.

According to the book, drinking water is a central focus on Mars, where it is scarce. Martians use the merging of their bodies with water as a simple example or symbol of how two entities can combine to create a new reality greater than the sum of its parts. The water becomes part of the drinker, and the drinker part of the water. Both grok each other. Things that once had separate realities become entangled in the same experiences, goals, history, and purpose. Within the book, the statement of divine immanence verbalized among the main characters, "thou art God", is logically derived from the concept inherent in the term grok.

Heinlein describes Martian words as "guttural" and "jarring". Martian speech is described as sounding "like a bullfrog fighting a cat". Accordingly, grok is generally pronounced as a guttural gr terminated by a sharp k with very little or no vowel sound (a narrow IPA transcription might be ). William Tenn suggests Heinlein in creating the word might have been influenced by Tenn's very similar concept of griggo, earlier introduced in Tenn's story "Venus and the Seven Sexes" (published in 1949). In his later afterword to the story, Tenn says Heinlein considered such influence "very possible".

Adoption and modern usage

In computer programmer culture
Uses of the word in the decades after the 1960s are more concentrated in computer culture, such as a 1984 appearance in InfoWorld: "There isn't any software! Only different internal states of hardware. It's all hardware! It's a shame programmers don't grok that better."

The Jargon File, which describes itself as a "Hacker's Dictionary" and has been published under that name three times, puts grok in a programming context:

The entry existed in the very earliest forms of the Jargon File, dating from the early 1980s. A typical tech usage from the Linux Bible, 2005 characterizes the Unix software development philosophy as "one that can make your life a lot simpler once you grok the idea".

The book Perl Best Practices defines grok as understanding a portion of computer code in a profound way. It goes on to suggest that to re-grok code is to reload the intricacies of that portion of code into one's memory after some time has passed and all the details of it are no longer remembered. In that sense, to grok means to load everything into memory for immediate use. It is analogous to the way a processor caches memory for short term use, but the only implication by this reference was that it was something a human (or perhaps a Martian) would do.

The main web page for cURL, an open source tool and programming library, describes the function of cURL as "cURL groks URLs".

The book Cyberia covers its use in this subculture extensively:

The keystroke logging software used by the NSA for its remote intelligence gathering operations is named GROK.

One of the most powerful parsing filters used in ElasticSearch software's logstash component is named grok.

A reference book by Carey Bunks on the use of the GNU Image Manipulation Program is titled Grokking the GIMP

A common tool used for cloud development is a tool called ngrok, which stands for 'network grok'. It is a tool that allows you to create a secure tunnel on your local machine along with a public URL that you can use for accessing your local webserver. This is mainly useful for local debugging.

In counterculture

Tom Wolfe, in his book The Electric Kool-Aid Acid Test (1968), describes a character's thoughts during an acid trip: "He looks down, two bare legs, a torso rising up at him and like he is just noticing them for the first time... he has never seen any of this flesh before, this stranger. He groks over that..."

In his counterculture Volkswagen repair manual, How to Keep Your Volkswagen Alive: A Manual of Step-by-Step Procedures for the Compleat Idiot (1969), dropout aerospace engineer John Muir instructs prospective used VW buyers to "grok the car" before buying.

The word was used numerous times by Robert Anton Wilson in his works The Illuminatus! Trilogy and Schrödinger's Cat Trilogy.

The term inspired actress Mayim Bialik's women's lifestyle site, Grok Nation.

The long-running science program The Groks Science Radio Show centers on the idea of "grokking" science.

The word was used numerous times in the American television show Adventure Time.

The word was used by Joanna Russ in the book The Female Man.

 The word was used by Tricia Sullivan in the book Dreaming in Smoke. "He sounded so condescending that she wanted to say, yeah, I do; I totally grok it."

See also

  Anschauung –  related "sense-perception" concept in Kantian philosophy

 Being-in-the-world – a term in the existentialist philosophy of Martin Heidegger, aimed at deconstructing the subject–object distinction
 Knowledge by acquaintance and knowledge by description – a distinction in philosophy between familiarity with a person, place, or thing and knowledge of facts
 Logos – a term in Western philosophy that has been used to describe various forms of knowledge and reasoning
 Phenomenology (psychology) – the study of subjective experience

References

External links

 
 SF citations for grok gathered for the Oxford English Dictionary by Jesse Sheidlower
 
 
 
 WikiQuote on Stranger in a Strange Land includes many uses of grok

Hippie movement
Science fiction themes
Robert A. Heinlein
1961 neologisms
Words originating in fiction
Sources of knowledge